Richard James Peniket (born 4 March 1993) is a footballer who most recently played for  side Kidderminster Harriers, where he played as a forward.

Playing career

Walsall
Peniket was born in Stourbridge, West Midlands, and began his football career with Walsall.

Fulham
In 2009, despite interest from Manchester United, Peniket joined Fulham. In June 2010, Peniket signed his first professional contract, keeping him until 2013.

In October 2011, Peniket joined League Two club Hereford on a one-month loan, later extended until the end of the season. He made his Football League debut in the 2–1 home defeat to Bristol Rovers on 10 January 2012, replacing Delroy Facey for the last twelve minutes of the match.

On 30 August 2012, Peniket signed for Conference National team Kidderminster Harriers on a loan deal from Fulham until January 2013. He made his début for Kidderminster in a 1–1 draw against Barrow, coming on as a substitute in the 71st minute. On 21 November, Fulham confirmed that Peniket had been recalled.

Peniket signed for Conference side AFC Telford United on a one-month loan on 29 January 2013 and made his début the same day, against Kidderminster Harriers away, losing the match 1–0. Peniket scored his first ever senior goal for AFC Telford United against Hyde at New Bucks Head on 12 February 2013.

On 2 March 2013, Peniket signed for Conference South club Farnborough on an initial one-month loan deal. On 22 March 2013, this loan was extended until the end of the season.

Peniket was one of twelve players released by Fulham at the end of the 2012–13 Premier League season.

Tamworth
Following his release by Fulham, Peniket moved down four divisions to join Conference National side Tamworth on a one-year contract. He scored twice in a 4–1 victory over Southport on 7 September 2013, after failing to score in his first five games.

Halifax Town
Peniket signed for Halifax Town on 24 June 2014 on a free transfer. He scored his first two goals for the Yorkshire side in a 3–0 victory over Welling.

Gateshead
On 26 May 2017, Peniket signed a one-year deal with National League side Gateshead following him turning down the offer of a new contract from Halifax Town. He made his debut on 5 August in a 1–2 defeat away to Woking and scored his first goal for the club the following week in a 3–0 victory over Torquay United.

Alfreton Town
In June 2018, Peniket joined National League North side Alfreton Town on a one-year deal.

Return to Kidderminster Harriers
In June 2019, Peniket returned to Kidderminster Harriers. He departed the club on 21 January 2020, stating he wanted to take some time away from football and give himself a chance to recover from cumulative injuries.

Gulf United FC 
In January 2022, Peniket signed with Gulf United. Peniket featured regularly and finished the 2021–22 season with 8 goals in 11 games. Gulf United managed to secure promotion to the UAE Second Division, as well as winning the UAE Third Division title.

International career
Peniket has played for Wales at levels up to under-21. He has six appearances for the Wales under-19 team, and made his debut for the under-21s in a 2–1 friendly defeat against Hungary on 10 August 2011.

Career statistics

Honours
FC Halifax Town
FA Trophy: 2015–16

Gulf United

 UAE Third Division: 2021–22

References

External links
 
 

1993 births
Living people
Sportspeople from Stourbridge
English footballers
Welsh footballers
Wales youth international footballers
Wales under-21 international footballers
Association football forwards
Walsall F.C. players
Fulham F.C. players
Hereford United F.C. players
Kidderminster Harriers F.C. players
AFC Telford United players
Farnborough F.C. players
Tamworth F.C. players
FC Halifax Town players
Gateshead F.C. players
English Football League players
National League (English football) players
English people of Welsh descent
Alfreton Town F.C. players